David Kotrys (born 3 June 1977 in Český Těšín) is a Czech former football player.

Career
Kotrys played for several Czech clubs before moving to Poland in 2009.

References

External links

Czech footballers
1977 births
Living people
People from Český Těšín
Czech First League players
MFK Karviná players
MFK Vítkovice players
SK Sigma Olomouc players
Bohemians 1905 players
FC Vysočina Jihlava players
FC Baník Ostrava players
Polonia Bytom players
Expatriate footballers in Poland
Czech expatriate sportspeople in Poland
Association football defenders
Sportspeople from the Moravian-Silesian Region